Raho is a surname. Notable people with the surname include:

Alessandro Raho (born 1971), British artist
Pipi Raho (born 1988), Papua New Guinean cricketer
Slimane Raho (born 1975), Algerian footballer
Umberto Raho (1922–2016), Italian stage, film, and television actor

See also
Aho (name)